Issarapong Lilakorn is a Thai retired footballer.

International career

On the back of performing extremely well in the Thailand Division 1 League, Issarapong was called up to the full national side in coach Peter Reid's first squad announcement. He was called up with 35 other players to the 2008 T&T Cup hosted by Vietnam.

Issarapong was a member of the victorious T&T Cup 2008 winning squad.

Honours
 T&T Cup: 2008

References

External links
Profile at Thaipremierleague.co.th

1988 births
Living people
Issarapong Lilakorn
Issarapong Lilakorn
Issarapong Lilakorn
Issarapong Lilakorn
Issarapong Lilakorn
Issarapong Lilakorn
Issarapong Lilakorn
Issarapong Lilakorn
Issarapong Lilakorn
Association football forwards
Association football midfielders
Nakhon Si United F.C. players